Cipher is a shōjo manga series written and illustrated by Minako Narita. It was serialized in Hakusensha's LaLa magazine from the February 1985 issue to the December 1990 issue, and was collected in Japan in twelve tankōbon volumes and seven bunkoban volumes.

A sequel manga series titled Alexandrite was published in LaLa from 1991 to 1994, and compiled in Japan in seven tankōbon volumes and four bunkoban volumes.

Cipher was also adapted into a promotional English-language OVA titled Cipher the Video in 1989, with Narita's input and involvement.

Plot
The story of Cipher is set in mid-1980s America, mainly New York City. It concerns the lives of former child stars twins Shiva (Jake Lang) and Cipher (Roy Lang), who mysteriously began to trade places until the two became synonymous with each other. Anise Murphy is a classmate of Shiva's, and shortly after becoming acquainted with him ends up entangled in a bet to see if she can tell the two apart after living at their apartment for two weeks.

Characters
 Anise Murphy
 Jake Lang (Shiva)
 Roy Lang (Cipher)
 Rob
 Jessica 
 Ruth
 Alex Levine
 Haru (Hal) Takeshita
 Jean Lang

OVA Cast 
The voice acting for the OVA was done entirely in English, without a Japanese version. Most of the cast consisted of bilingual Japanese actors and a few native English speakers in Japan.

Media

Manga

Cipher is written and illustrated by Minako Narita. It was serialized in the monthly magazine LaLa from December 24, 1984, to October 24, 1990. The chapters were later released in 12 bound volumes by Hakusensha under the Hana to Yume Comics imprint.

CMX licensed the series in North America in 2005. It went out of print when DC Comics shut down the CMX imprint in 2010.

Tankōbon editions

References

External links

CMX (comics) titles
Hakusensha manga
Magic Bus (studio)
Shōjo manga